The Bill Chivers House, on 3rd St. in Challis in Custer County, Idaho, is a historic house built in 1900.  It was listed on the National Register of Historic Places in 1980.

It is a one-story house asserted to have elements of Queen Anne and Colonial Revival styles.  Its Idaho State Historical Society review states:The most decorated one-story Queen Anne-style house in Challis is still pretty plain. The Bill Chivers House survives in good and apparently unaltered condition except for the asphalt shingles.. Features common to Challis domestic buildings are exemplified in this building: the blend of Queen Anne and American colonial revival features, the use of delicate porch posts and hipped porch roofs, and the nearly invariable enclosure of eaves.

It was built by Australian-born farmer Thomas Jose for his daughter and her husband Bill Chivers.

References

Houses on the National Register of Historic Places in Idaho
Queen Anne architecture in Idaho
Colonial Revival architecture in Idaho
Houses completed in 1900
Custer County, Idaho